Kannur has a good road network connecting to Bangalore, Mangalore, Kodagu and Cochin.  The railway station is also well connected to all parts of India.  There is new International airport  from Kannur opened on 9 December 2018, other  nearest airports are at Calicut and Mangalore. Thalassery, Payyanur, Taliparamba and Iritty are the other transport hubs.

Air Transport
Kannur International Airport located at Mattanur in Kannur District, Kerala, India opened for commercial operations on 9 December 2018. It is the fourth international airport in Kerala. The airport will have a 4,000m runway (the longest in the State) and state of the art passenger terminal as well other amenities. Domestic routes include Mumbai, Bangalore, Hyderabad, Chennai, Goa and Hubli while international routes include Abu Dhabi, Sharjah, Doha and Riyadh.

Kannur port
Kannur is an ancient seaport. The nearest all-weather seaport is Mangaluru in Karnataka state. Azhikkal port in Kannur has been included for developing coastal shipping by the Government of India under the National Maritime Development Programme (NMDP). A detailed project report (DPR) has been prepared by ICICI-KINFRA for the development of Azhikkal port. Azhikal port was allocated ₹ 50cr for development in the interim budget of 2016 by the Government of Kerala.

Transport by Road

This highway is scheduled to be expanded to four lanes. A bypass for Kannur city is proposed under the NH widening project. Kannur is connected to Kodagu, Mysore and Bangalore in Karnataka by the Thalassery–Coorg–Mysore interstate highway.

Kannur has several private and KSRTC buses plying places inside and outside the district. Kannur is well-connected to its suburbs through several city buses. Kannur city has four bus terminals — Kannur Central Bus Terminal at Thavakkara which is Kerala's biggest private bus terminal, Old Bus Stand near the Jawaharlal Nehru Stadium, City Bus Stand near  the District HQ Hospital and the KSRTC bus depot at Caltex Junction (on NH-66). The busiest section of the National Highway 66 is between the towns of Puthiyatheru and Thazhe Chovva (about 10.5 km). There are also KSRTC Depots at Payyanur and Thalassery.

National Highways
National Highway 66 connects Kannur to Mumbai via Mangalore, Udupi and Goa to the north and Kochi, Thiruvananthapuram and Kanyakumari to the south along the west coast of India. This highway connects the city with the other important towns like, Uppala, Kasaragod, Kanhangad, Payyanur, Taliparamba, Thalassery, Mahe, Vadakara, Koyilandy, Kozhikode, Vengalam,
Ramanattukara, Kottakkal, Kuttippuram, Ponnani, (Guruvayoor) Chavakkad, Kodungallur, North Paravur, Edapally and proceed to Kanyakumari.

State Highways
SH 59, the longest state highway in Kerala passes through hilly areas of Kannur district like Cherupuzha, Alakode, Payyavoor, Ulikkal, Iritty, Edoor, Peravoor and Kottiyoor.

SH 38 starts in Chala Bypass Junction (Kannur) and ends in Puthiyangadi (Kozhikode). The highway passes through Kadachira, Mavilayi, Peralassery, Kuthuparamba, Panoor, Nadapuram, Kuttiady, Perambra, Ulliyeri  Pavangad and Kozhikode.

SH 30 or Thalassery - Coorg Highway starts in Thalassery and ends in Vilamana-Koottupuzha (Kerala-Karnataka state border). The highway passes through Kadirur, Kuthuparamba, Mattannur and Iritty.

SH 36 starts in Taliparamba and ends in Iritty. The highway passes through Sreekandapuram and Irikkur.

Thavakkara Bus station
Thavakkara Bus Terminal, also called Kannur Central Bus Terminal or Central Bus Terminal Complex, is a bus station in Kannur, Kerala, India. It is located near to Kannur Railway Station. It is also India's first bus terminal to be developed on a build-operate- transfer (BOT) basis. The project is a joint venture of the Kannur Municipality and the KK Group, being implemented on Build-Operate-Transfer (BOT) concept. Most of the floors inside the terminal are marked for commercial purposes, which include central lobby, passengers waiting area and parking facilities.
 Multiple Bus bays
 Parking Bay for Cars, Two Wheelers and Autorickshaws
 Food Courts
 Cloakroom
 Passenger Amenities
Thavakkara Bus Terminal,  serves as the main boarding & alighting point in Kannur for all the passengers travelling outside city and state. It has buses catering to long distances services and short distance buses.
There are many long distance bus services which operates with in Kerala state and to various district headquarters. Interstate bus services towards Mangalore, is also available from Thavakkara Bus Terminal.

The bus stand complex includes one luxury hotel, one budget hotel and one dormitory.

Railway System
Kannur Railway Station is one of the major stations of the Southern Railway, under the jurisdiction of the Palakkad Division. All trains including the Thiruvananthapuram Rajdhani Express and Kochuveli Garib Rath stop at Kannur. Six daily trains and around 15 weekly or bi-weekly trains connect Kannur to the capital Thiruvananthapuram.

Trains starting from Kannur are:

 Kannur - Thiruvananthapuram Jan Shatabdi Express
 Kannur - Yeshwantpur Express (via Palghat and Salem)
 Kannur - Bengaluru City Express via Mangalore, Mysore (tri-weekly)
 Kannur - Bengaluru City Express via Kunigal, Yeswantpur (Four days a week)
 Kannur - Alappuzha Executive Express 
 Kannur - Ernakulam Intercity Express

Passenger trains
Kannur - Coimbatore
Kannur - Mangalore
Kannur - Calicut
Kannur - Shoranur
Trichur - Kannur
Kannur - Cheruvathur

Kannur South, Chirakkal, Valapattanam and Pappinisseri are minor railway stations near Kannur where only passenger trains stop. A survey for a railway line from Kannur South to Kannur International Airport in Mattannur was announced in the 2011–2012 Union Railway Budget.Kannur, also known as Cannanore,  is one of the busiest railway station in Kerala located in the Kannur City which lies in Shoranur–Mangalore section. It is operated by the Southern Railway of the Indian Railways. There are many trains operating towards Southern Kerala, Tamil Nadu, Mumbai and North India. Kannur and Kannur South are two different stations which serves Kannur City.

This Station has Four platforms, namely Platform No.1, 1A, 2 and 3 and two entrances. Another platform and new exclusive entrance is under construction towards east. The Platform number 1 of the Kannur Railway Station is the second longest railway platform in the state of Kerala.

There is strong urge from the passengers for extension of various trains and new trains. The trains that could be extended include Matsyagandha Express, Madgaon Intercity Express, Calicut Janshatabdi. It could be achieved by constructing a new pitline and increasing the number of platforms. Kannur-Byndoor passenger can be extended to Bhatkal.

The Kannur Railway Station is one of the few railway stations in Kerala to be selected for Google's plan to deploy WiFi in collaboration with the Union Government of India.

Important Trains
 Kannur - Thiruvananthapuram Jan Shatabdi Express
 Kannur - Yeswantpur Express (Via Palghat and Salem)
 Kannur - Bengaluru City Express (Via Mangaluru)
 Kannur - Ernakulam (Executive Express Thursday, Saturday only)
 Kannur - Alappuzha (Executive Express except Thursday, Saturday) 
 Kannur - Ernakulam (Intercity Express)

Slow Trains

Kannur - Coimbatore fast passenger
Kannur - Mangaluru passenger
Kannur - Calicut passenger
Kannur - Shoranur passenger
Kannur - Cheruvathur passenger
Kannur - Thrissur passenger
Kannur - Byndoor passenger (via Mangaluru junction)

Other Trains
 Hazrat Nizamuddin - Trivandrum Rajdhani Express
 Hazrat Nizamuddin - Ernakulam Mangala Lakshadweep Express
 Chennai - Mangaluru Mail via Podanur
 Chennai - Mangaluru West Coast Express via Coimbatore
 Chennai - Mangaluru Superfast Express via Podanur
 Chennai Egmore - Mangaluru Express via Trichy
 Mumbai (LTT) - Trivandrum Nethravathi Express via Alappuzha
 Mumbai (LTT) - Kochuveli Garibrath Express via Kottayam
 Chandigarh- Kochuveli Kerala Sampark Kranti Express via Alappuzha
 Mangaluru- Trivandrum Malabar express via Kottayam
 Mangaluru- Nagercoil Parasuram express via Kottayam
 Mangaluru- Trivandrum Maveli express via Alappuzha
 Mangaluru- Trivandrum express via Kottayam
 Mangaluru- Coimbatore Intercity s/f express
 Mangaluru- Nagercoil Ernad express via Alappuzha

Kannur is connected to several major Indian cities via daily direct trains.  Some of the cities connected, with details of trains, are given below: 
 New Dehi by: Trivandrum-Hazrat Nizamuddin Rajdhani Express & Ernakulam - Hazrat Nizamuddin Mangala Lakshadweep Express, Kerala Sampark Kranti Express, Kochuveli-Amritsar Express, Kochuveli-Dehradun express, Navyug express
 Mumbai  by: Trivandrum-Lokamanya Tilak (Mumbai) Netravati Express, Kochuveli-Lokmanya Tilak Garibrath express, Kochuveli-Ltt s/f express
 Chennai by: Mangaluru-Chennai (Chennai Mail, West Coast, Egmore and Chennai Express)
 Bangalore by: Kannur-Yeswantpur (2 Express; one via Salem and another via Mangaluru)
 Ahmedabad by: Ernakulam-Okha Express, Nagercoil-Gandhidam express, Thiruvananthapuram-Veraval express, Kochuveli-Bhavnagar express, Kochuveli-Bikaner express, Tirunelveli-Hapa express, Kochuveli-Porbandar express, Coimbatore-Bikaner a/c super fast express
 Pune by: Ernakulam-Pune Poorna Express, Ernakulam Pune Superfast express
 Jaipur by: Ernakulam-Ajmer Marusagar Express
 Goa by: Ernakulam-Madgoan express and all trains passing through Konkan railways
 Hyderabad by: Kacheguda Express
 Kolkata by: Vivek Express

Facilities at Kannur Railway Station
 Retiring rooms
 IRCTC Restaurants
 Online Reservation 
 Internet cafe
 Railway Police Force (RPF)
 Railway Mail Service (RMS)

References

Transport in Kannur
Transport in Kannur district